The American Helicopter XH-26 Jet Jeep (known as the XA-8 by its manufacturer) was an experimental tip jet helicopter developed in 1951 by the American Helicopter Company to meet a United States Army and Air Force (USAF) request for a collapsible and air-droppable observation helicopter.

Design and development
The design of the original Model XA-8 single-seat lightweight helicopter began in 1951 under the sponsorship of the US Army Transportation Corps and the USAF. The Army's specification in 1950 called for a lightweight, one-man unarmed helicopter that was collapsible, capable of aerial delivery to troops in rugged terrain, and assembled quickly with simple tools. The helicopter was to be used for both light observation and as an air-droppable rescue vehicle for downed aircrews. After a review of all proposals American Helicopter was awarded the development contract in June 1951, based on its XA-8 design proposal. The first of five prototype XH-26s flew in January 1952.

The XH-26 was constructed of aluminum, except for the aft fuselage, which was laminated fiberglass, and possessed a well-glazed, pyramidal-shaped cockpit. When collapsed, its  container fit on a trailer that could be towed by a military Jeep. It could be assembled by two men in 20 minutes. The XH-26 did not use any gears, or an internal engine like other helicopters. Rather, the Jet Jeep was powered by two  XPJ49 pulse jet engines mounted on the end of each rotor blade tip as tip jets. Since the engines did not have to be warmed up, the XH-26 could take off in 30 seconds. The pulse jets produced no torque, and the tiny, belt-driven tail rotor was used only to improve directional control. The only mechanical item that had to be replaced after so many hours of flight was the intake air vanes, which were small and inexpensive and could be replaced with a small tool in minutes.

American Helicopter chose the name "Jet Jeep", because the XH-26 could be used like a Jeep, but in the air. It could be transported by a Jeep, and even used the same fuel. The XH-26 could be dropped by air and assembled and be ready for flight in 20 minutes.

Operational history
Both the Army and USAF evaluated the five prototype Jet Jeeps. Unfortunately, the pulse jets produced an unacceptable amount of noise and the drag of the engines in the event of power loss would prevent safe landings by autorotation. For these two reasons the Army found the pulse jet helicopters unsuitable as it had those with ramjets. Finally, cost considerations forced the cancellation of the program. The replacement of the XH-26's pulse jets with ramjets was suggested but never undertaken; however, the Hiller YH-32 Hornet helicopter was built using blade tip ramjets.

Operators

 United States Air Force
 United States Army

Surviving aircraft
 50-1840 – XH-26 in storage at the United States Army Aviation Museum in Ozark, Alabama
 50-1841 – XH-26 on static display at the National Museum of the United States Air Force in Dayton, Ohio.

Specifications (XH-26)

See also

References

Notes

Bibliography

 Apostolo, Giorgio. The Illustrated Encyclopedia of Helicopters. New York: Bonanza Books, 1984. . 
 Simpson, R. W. Airlife's Helicopters and Rotorcraft. Ramsbury, UK: Airlife Publishing, 1998. .

H-26
Experimental helicopters
Pulsejet-powered aircraft
1950s United States military utility aircraft
1950s United States helicopters
Tipjet-powered helicopters
Aircraft first flown in 1952